The Philadelphia Daily News Open was a golf tournament on the PGA Tour that was played in 1955 and 1956 at Cobbs Creek Golf Club in Philadelphia.

The PGA Tour returned to Philadelphia in September 1955, six years after the last Philadelphia Inquirer Open had been played. The 1955 event was won by Ted Kroll at the first hole of a sudden-death playoff over Doug Ford when both finished 72 holes with a one-over-par score of 273. The 1956 event was played in June and was won by Dick Mayer at the second-hole of a sudden-death playoff with Bud Holscher.  During the two years that the event played, only Mayer and Holscher were under par for 72 holes. Total prize money was $20,000.

Winners

References

Former PGA Tour events
Golf in Pennsylvania
Sports in Philadelphia
Recurring sporting events established in 1955
Recurring sporting events disestablished in 1956
1955 establishments in Pennsylvania
1956 disestablishments in Pennsylvania